The 2017 Houston Baptist Huskies football team represented Houston Baptist University—now known as Houston Christian University—as a member of the Southland Conference during the 2017 NCAA Division I FCS football season. Led by fifth-year head coach Vic Shealy the Huskies compiled an overall record of 1–10 with a mark of 0–9 in conference play, placing last out of 11 teams in the Southland. Houston Baptist played home games at Husky Stadium in Houston.

Previous season
The Huskies finished the 2016 season with a 4–7 overall record and a 3–5 record in Southland Conference play to finish in 7th place.

Schedule

* Games were televised on tape delay.

Sources

Houston Baptist
Houston Christian Huskies football seasons
Houston Baptist Huskies football